Bulbine favosa (also known as the Leafless Kopieva) is a species of plant in the genus Bulbine which grows in sandy soils in South Africa. While flowering, B. favosa has no leaves; its common name is in reference to this. When it is not flowering, it has narrow dark green leaves that look like a sedge crossed with a Grape Hyacinth. B. favosa usually flowers in May for a short time; its flowers are yellow and small.

References 

favosa